Mesa (Spanish for "Table") is a census-designated place (CDP) in Inyo County, California, United States. The population was 251 at the 2010 census, up from 214 at the 2000 census.

Geography

Demographics

2010
The 2010 United States Census reported that Mesa had a population of 251. The racial makeup of Mesa was 220 (87.6%) White, 0 (0.0%) African American, 10 (4.0%) Native American, 3 (1.2%) Asian, 0 (0.0%) Pacific Islander, 14 (5.6%) from other races, and 4 (1.6%) from two or more races. Hispanic or Latino of any race were 26 persons (10.4%).

The Census reported that 251 people (100% of the population) lived in households, 0 (0%) lived in non-institutionalized group quarters, and 0 (0%) were institutionalized.

There were 104 households, out of which 21 (20.2%) had children under the age of 18 living in them, 75 (72.1%) were opposite-sex married couples living together, 2 (1.9%) had a female householder with no husband present, 5 (4.8%) had a male householder with no wife present.  There were 5 (4.8%) unmarried opposite-sex partnerships, and 2 (1.9%) same-sex married couples or partnerships. 14 households (13.5%) were made up of individuals, and 6 (5.8%) had someone living alone who was 65 years of age or older. The average household size was 2.41.  There were 82 families (78.8% of all households); the average family size was 2.62.

The population was spread out, with 33 people (13.1%) under the age of 18, 22 people (8.8%) aged 18 to 24, 39 people (15.5%) aged 25 to 44, 117 people (46.6%) aged 45 to 64, and 40 people (15.9%) who were 65 years of age or older.  The median age was 50.0 years. For every 100 females, there were 97.6 males.  For every 100 females age 18 and over, there were 98.2 males.

The homeowner vacancy rate was 0%; the rental vacancy rate was 0%.  184 people (73.3% of the population) lived in owner-occupied housing units and 67 people (26.7%) lived in rental housing units.

2000
As of the census of 2000, there were 214 people, 85 households, and 64 families residing in the CDP. There were 91 housing units at an average density of 25.5 per square mile (9.8/km). The racial makeup of the CDP was 89.25% White, 0.47% Black or African American, 2.80% Native American, 1.87% Asian, 0.47% Pacific Islander, 0.93% from other races, and 4.21% from two or more races.  7.01% of the population were Hispanic or Latino of any race.

There were 85 households, out of which 25.9% had children under the age of 18 living with them, 69.4% were married couples living together, 2.4% had a female householder with no husband present, and 24.7% were non-families. 18.8% of all households were made up of individuals, and 7.1% had someone living alone who was 65 years of age or older.  The average household size was 2.52 and the average family size was 2.86.

In the CDP, the population was spread out, with 19.2% under the age of 18, 6.1% from 18 to 24, 18.2% from 25 to 44, 41.6% from 45 to 64, and 15.0% who were 65 years of age or older.  The median age was 47 years. For every 100 females, there were 105.8 males.  For every 100 females age 18 and over, there were 101.2 males.

The median income for a household in the CDP was $74,375, and the median income for a family was $76,543. Males had a median income of $51,250 versus $25,357 for females. The per capita income for the CDP was $25,376.  About 2.6% of families and 2.4% of the population were below the poverty line, including none of those under the age of eighteen and 6.5% of those 65 or over.

Politics

References

Census-designated places in Inyo County, California
Owens Valley
Census-designated places in California